Jacob Klein (born 1949), former holder of the Herman Mark Chair of Polymer Physics in the Materials and Interfaces Department at the Weizmann Institute in Rehovot, Israel and Dr Lee's Professor of Chemistry at the University of Oxford, is an internationally renowned soft condensed matter, polymer and surface scientist.

Klein was an undergraduate and graduate at Cambridge University and held a research fellowship and later a fellowship at St. Catharine's College, Cambridge between 1976 and 1984. He held a postdoctoral fellowship at the Department of Polymer Research, Weizmann Institute between 1977 and 1980, after which he worked jointly as university demonstrator with the Physics Department, Cambridge, and as a senior scientist at the Weizmann Institute. Klein was appointed an associate professor at the Weizmann Institute in 1984 and became a full professor in 1987, heading the Institute's Polymer Research Department throughout 1989 to 1991.

In October 2000 Klein was appointed as head of the Physical and Theoretical Chemistry Laboratory, Oxford. He is a fellow of Exeter College, and until 2008 held the Dr Lee's Chair of Chemistry, a position previously held by Nobel prize winners Frederick Soddy and Sir Cyril Norman Hinshelwood. He was succeeded in that position by Professor Carol Robinson. Professor Klein currently heads a research group at the Weizmann Institute of Science.

He was elected a  Fellow of the American Physical Society in 2003. He was awarded the Tribology Gold Medal from the Institution of Mechanical Engineers (IMechE) in 2012.

References

External links
 Research homepage
 Weizmann Research Group homepage

1949 births
Living people
Alumni of St Catharine's College, Cambridge
Fellows of St Catharine's College, Cambridge
Fellows of Exeter College, Oxford
Academic staff of Weizmann Institute of Science
Dr Lee's Professors of Chemistry
Fellows of the American Physical Society
Tribologists